A bunkie board is thin mattress support originally intended for a bunk bed.  It was invented in the early 20th century to provide a thinner platform support than box-springs, and more uniform support than slats.

Construction 
A DIY bunkie board might consist of  plywood, but commercially-made versions can be made of wood or metal, and are often covered in fabric.

References  

Bedding
Furniture